Scotland is an unincorporated community in Yazoo County, Mississippi, United States.

The Scotland Church and Cemetery are located south of the settlement.

Residents are within the Yazoo County School District. Residents are zoned to Yazoo County Middle School and Yazoo County High School.

References

Unincorporated communities in Mississippi
Unincorporated communities in Yazoo County, Mississippi